In mathematics, a Dirichlet algebra is a particular type of algebra associated to a compact Hausdorff space X.  It is a closed subalgebra of C(X), the uniform algebra of bounded continuous functions on X, whose real parts are dense in the algebra of bounded continuous real functions on X. The concept was introduced by .

Example

Then

This generalises Sz.-Nagy's dilation theorem, which can be seen as a consequence of this by letting

References

Completely Bounded Maps and Operator Algebras Vern Paulsen, 2002 
.

Functional analysis
C*-algebras